The Battle of Münchengrätz or Battle of Mnichovo Hradiště was fought near Mnichovo Hradiště, modern day Czech Republic, on 28 June 1866 during the Austro-Prussian War. It ended in a Prussian victory over the Austrian Empire.

Events
Having lost the engagements at Hühnerwasser and Podol, and with the Prussian Elbe Army and 1st Army bearing in on them from the west and the north, Clam-Gallas and his ally, Prince Albert of Saxony, decided to have the Iser Army abandon its exposed position near Münchengrätz. While three Austrian brigades, under Count Leiningen, remained to slow the Prussian pursuit, Clam-Gallas sent Ringelsheims's and Poschacher's brigades east towards Jičín, while the five Saxon brigades marched south to Jungbunzlau. Leiningen deployed his Jäger units in town and posted the line regiments from his own brigade across the Iser river in Klaster, Piret's brigade deployed on Musky Hill, and Abele's brigade drew up in battalion columns on the road from Podol.

The Prussian 31st Brigade, part of the Elbe Army, started the battle and attacked Klaster making the 38th Austrian Regiment, consisting out of Venetians, to rapidly abandon their position on the hill. In the north, Prince Frederick Charles attacked the north side of Musky Hill with his Prussian 8th Division, under Horn, where they encountered Piret and Abele, while the Prussian 7th Division, under Fransecky, marched through the morass behind the heights to cut the Austrian communication lines to Münchengrätz and Jičín. Seeing the danger of being encircled, Leiningen ordered his brigade to withdraw from the town. The Prussians of the Elbe Army then occupied the town and, being thirsty and hungry from the long march, abandoned formation to sack the town and drink at the local brewery.

Abele's brigade held long enough on the slopes of the hill for Leiningen and Piret to untangle and the Austrian brigades escaped to the east, leaving some 3000 men in killed, wounded and prisoners. The Prussians, having only engaged with 14 battalions, only lost about 300 men, but managed to link up their two armies and drive the Austrians and their Saxon allies out of their Iser line.

References 

 Geoffrey Wawro, The Austro-Prussian War. Austria's war with Prussia and Italy in 1866 (New York 2007), p. 156-159.
 Heinz Helmert; Hans-Jürgen Usczeck: Preußischdeutsche Kriege von 1864 bis 1871 - Militärischer Verlauf. 6. überarbeitete Auflage, Militärverlag der deutschen demokratischen Republik, Berlin 1988, 
 German General Staff, Campaign of 1866 in Germany Battery Press, Nashville 1994

Conflicts in 1866
Munchengratz
Munchengratz
Munchengratz
Munchengratz
1866 in the Austrian Empire
19th century in Bohemia
June 1866 events
History of the Central Bohemian Region